Road to Nowhere is a 2010 American romance thriller independent film directed by Monte Hellman, written by Steven Gaydos, and starring Cliff De Young, Waylon Payne, Shannyn Sossamon, Tygh Runyan, and Dominique Swain. It was Hellman's first feature film in 21 years, as well as his final feature film before his death in April 2021.

Road to Nowhere was shot in western North Carolina from July to August 2009, before moving to Europe. The film premiered on September 10, 2010, at the 67th Venice International Film Festival and was nominated for the Golden Lion, but won Jury Award Special Lion for Career Achievement. The film was given a limited release in New York on June 10, 2011, and in Los Angeles on June 17, 2011.

Plot
A promising young filmmaker named Mitchell Haven invites Laurel Graham, an unknown actress, to play Velma Duran, a person involved in a financial scandal that made headlines, in his new film. The director falls in love with his muse, and the sordid criminal affair on which the film is based resurfaces.

Cast
 Shannyn Sossamon as Laurel Graham/Velma Duran
 Dominique Swain as Nathalie Post
 Cliff De Young as Cary Stewart/Rafe Taschen
 Tygh Runyan as Mitchell Haven
 Fabio Testi as Nestor Duran
 John Diehl as Bobby Billings
 Waylon Payne as Bruno Brotherton
 Rob Kolar as Steve Gates
 Bonnie Pointer as herself
 Michael Bigham as Joe Watts
 Lathan McKay as Erik
 Nic Paul as Jeremy Laidlaw
 Peter Bart has a cameo in the film playing himself

Production

Development
Road to Nowhere was Monte Hellman's first feature film in 21 years. The film was written by Variety executive editor Steven Gaydos.  Shannyn Sossamon was the first actor to be cast after Gaydos saw her in a restaurant rehearsing a scene with another person. Reluctantly, Gaydos gave Sossamon his card saying, "I don't do this often, but I wonder if you or your agent would contact Monte Hellman." Hellman told the Los Angeles Times that he dedicated the film to Laurie Bird, with whom Hellman fell in love while directing her in Two-Lane Blacktop.

Filming
On a budget of under $5 million, principal photography was almost entirely in western North Carolina (where the film is also set) between July and August 2009. Hellman shot with a Canon EOS 5D Mark II, which recorded 12 minutes at a time on a flash card (as opposed to 10 minutes with a 35mm film). Scenes were shot at the Balsam Mountain Inn in Balsam for four to five weeks. Several other scenes were shot in the Boyd Mountain Log Cabins in Waynesville.  Still other scenes were shot at Doc Holliday's bar in Maggie Valley, at the Fontana Dam, and at the Jackson County Airport. Students from University of North Carolina School of the Arts and Western Carolina University were hired as production assistants and also served as extras.  Other shooting locations were done in Los Angeles.

Jim Rowell, a Cullowhee resident got a deal with the filmmakers that allowed him to make a fuel pump repair at the airport in exchange for flying his 1966 Piper Cherokee four-passenger plane as a stuntman. Rowell did eight to nine passes over the lake, flying 300 to 500 feet above the water. In post-production, film editors cut the shots back and forth of Rowell flying near the dam and the actual actor sitting in Rowell's plane pretending to fly in front of a green screen and crashing the plane into the Fontana Dam. Natasha Senjanovic of The Hollywood Reporter called the plane crash one of "cinema's top plane crashes" and remarked that, "[it] is beautifully shot and comes as a total surprise".

Hellman still needed to shoot some scenes in Europe, but was over budget. His daughter, co-producer Melissa Hellman, raised more money through private equity. Hellman shot in the streets of London and traveled to Italy to shoot at Lake Garda. Other scenes were shot in the church of San Pietro in Vincoli, and in front of Michelangelo's Moses and the tomb of Pope Julius II in Rome.

Release
In January 2011, Monterey Media bought the United States distribution rights from Entertainment One. The American Cinematheque at the Egyptian hosted a tribute to Hellman which culminated on May 14, 2011, with a special premiere screening of Road to Nowhere. On June 8, 2011, the Film Society of Lincoln Center hosted an evening with Hellman, which included a special presentation of Road to Nowhere and a screening of Hellman's adaptation of Cockfighter.

Festivals
Road to Nowhere was selected to screen at the following film festivals:
2010 Whistler Film Festival
2010 Venice Film Festival
2010 Palm Springs International Film Festival
2010 South by Southwest
2011 Nashville Film Festival
2011 Karlovy Vary International Film Festival
2011 Filmfest Oldenburg

Limited theatrical run
Road to Nowhere was given a limited release in New York City on June 10, 2011 and in Los Angeles on June 17, 2011.  In New York the film opened in one theater and grossed $2,521 for its opening weekend. It grossed a total of $4,984 in its first week. In Los Angeles the film opened in six theaters and grossed $6,051—$864 per theater for its opening weekend, a 140% increase in tickets.  In its third week it grossed $3,936—$984 per theater, a 35% decrease in ticket sales from the previous week. It was removed from three theaters. In its fourth weekend, a four-day weekend, the film made $3,113—$778 per theater. By its fifth weekend it was removed from two theaters and had a 67% percent drop in tickets making $846–$423 per theater.  By its sixth weekend the film was playing in three theaters making $877–$292 per theater.  For its seventh weekend, it gained $3,609—$722 per theater in five theaters, an increase of 247.4% from the previous weekend.

The film grossed $83,496 in France and $37,829 in Portugal.  Road to Nowhere earned $40,294 in theatrical release in the United States and $121,325 in other markets, for a worldwide total of  $161,619.

Home media
Features include a 15-min behind the scenes (making of the film) video and a 14-min Q&A with Hellman and Gaydos at the Nashville Film Festival.

Critical reception
The film received mixed to positive reviews from critics, with many critics praising the performance of Shannyn Sossamon. Review aggregator Rotten Tomatoes reports that 73% of 26 critics have given the film a positive review. Metacritic, which assigns a weighted average score out of 100 to reviews from film critics, has a rating score of 59 based on 17 reviews.
 
Kevin Thomas of the Los Angeles Times wrote a positive review saying, "In its masterful use of evocative imagery and music, Road to Nowhere is flawless".  After an interview with Hellman, John Anderson from The New York Times said positive things about the film saying "Road may also be as significant to the indie feature as Avatar is to the popcorn movie".  Road to Nowhere was also included in Roger Corman's Legendary Films Blog.

Nick Dawson wrote a positive review after it screened at South by Southwest Film Festival. Lou Lumenick of the New York Post gave a negative review saying, "[Road to Nowhere] has a great setup but not much in the way of a payoff".  He went on to say "While there are some giggles in the film-within-the-film, the artsy-fartsy direction and flat-as-a-pancake acting invites invidious comparisons to Mulholland Drive". Roger Ebert gave the film two out of four stars criticizing the story's film within a film narrative. He said, "Road to Nowhere is not a failure in that it sets out to do exactly what it does, and does it. The question remains of why it should have been done. Hellman's skill is evident everywhere in precise framing and deliberate editing. Each scene works within itself on its own terms. But there is no whole here. I've rarely seen a narrative film that seemed so reluctant to flow. Nor perhaps one with a more accurate title".

Awards

References

Further reading

External links

2010 films
2010 independent films
2010 romance films
American independent films
American romance films
Films directed by Monte Hellman
Films set in North Carolina
Films shot in North Carolina
Films shot in London
Films shot in Rome
Films shot in Italy
Films shot in Los Angeles
Films about filmmaking
2010s English-language films
2010s American films